The 2018 Can-Am 500 was a Monster Energy NASCAR Cup Series race that was held on November 11, 2018, at ISM Raceway in Avondale, Arizona. Contested over 312 laps on the one mile (1.6 km) oval, it was the 35th race of the 2018 Monster Energy NASCAR Cup Series season, ninth race of the Playoffs, and final race of the Round of 8.

Report

Background

ISM Raceway – also known as PIR – is a one-mile, low-banked tri-oval race track located in Avondale, Arizona. It is named after the nearby metropolitan area of Phoenix. The motorsport track opened in 1964 and currently hosts two NASCAR race weekends annually. PIR has also hosted the IndyCar Series, CART, USAC and the Rolex Sports Car Series. The raceway is currently owned and operated by International Speedway Corporation.

The raceway was originally constructed with a  road course that ran both inside and outside of the main tri-oval. In 1991 the track was reconfigured with the current  interior layout. PIR has an estimated grandstand seating capacity of around 67,000. Lights were installed around the track in 2004 following the addition of a second annual NASCAR race weekend.

ISM Raceway is home to two annual NASCAR race weekends, one of 13 facilities on the NASCAR schedule to host more than one race weekend a year. The track is both the first and last stop in the western United States, as well as the fourth and penultimate track on the schedule.

Entry list

First practice

Qualifying

Qualifying results

Practice (post-qualifying)

Second practice

Final practice

Race

Stage Results

Stage 1
Laps: 75

Stage 2
Laps: 75

Final Stage Results

Stage 3
Laps: 162

Race statistics
 Lead changes: 8 among different drivers
 Cautions/Laps: 10 for 61
 Red flags: 1 for 16 minutes and 24 seconds
 Time of race: 3 hours, 10 minutes and 20 seconds
 Average speed:

Media

Television
NBC Sports covered the race on the television side. Rick Allen, two–time Phoenix winner Jeff Burton, Steve Letarte and three-time Phoenix winner Dale Earnhardt Jr. had the call in the booth for the race. Dave Burns, Parker Kligerman, Marty Snider and Kelli Stavast reported from pit lane during the race.

Radio
MRN had the radio call for the race, which was simulcast on Sirius XM NASCAR Radio.

Standings after the race

Manufacturers' Championship standings

Note: Only the first 16 positions are included for the driver standings.

References

2018 in sports in Arizona
Can-Am 500
NASCAR races at Phoenix Raceway
Can-Am 500